The mountain tapir, also known as the Andean tapir or woolly tapir (Tapirus pinchaque) is the smallest of the four widely recognized species of tapir. It is the only one to live outside of tropical rainforests in the wild. It is most easily distinguished from other tapirs by its thick woolly coat and white lips.

The species name comes from the term "La Pinchaque", an imaginary beast said to inhabit the same regions as the mountain tapir.

Description
 
Mountain tapirs are black or very dark brown, with occasional pale hairs flecked in amongst the darker fur. The fur becomes noticeably paler on the underside, around the anal region, and on the cheeks. A distinct white band runs around the lips, although it may vary in extent, and there are usually also white bands along the upper surface of the ears. In adults, the rump has paired patches of bare skin, which may help to indicate sexual maturity. The eyes are initially blue, but change to a pale brown as the animal ages. Unlike all other species of tapir, the fur is long and woolly, especially on the underside and flanks, reaching  or more in some individuals.
 

Like the other types of tapir, they have small, stubby tails and long, flexible proboscises. They have four toes on each front foot and three toes on each back foot, each with large nails and supported by a padded sole. A patch of bare skin, pale pink or grey in colour, extends just above each toe.

Reproduction
Female mountain tapirs have a 30-day estrous cycle, and typically breed only once every other year. During courtship, the male chases the female and uses soft bites, grunts, and squeals to get her attention, while the female responds with frequent squealing. After a gestation period of 392 or 393 days, the female gives birth to a single young; multiple births are very rare.

Like adults, baby mountain tapirs have thick, woolly fur to help keep them warm. Weaning begins at around three months of age. The immature coloration fades after about a year, but the mother continues to care for her young for around 18 months. Mountain tapirs reach sexual maturity at age three and have lived up to 27 years in captivity.

Ecology

Tapirs are herbivores, and eat a wide range of plants, including leaves, grasses, and bromeliads. In the wild, particularly common foods include lupins, Gynoxys, ferns, and umbrella plants. It also seeks out natural salt licks to satisfy its need for essential minerals.

Mountain tapirs are also important seed dispersers within their environments, and have been identified as a keystone species of the high Andes. A relatively high proportion of plant seeds eaten by mountain tapirs successfully germinate in their dung, probably due to a relatively inefficient digestive system and a tendency to defecate near water. Although a wide range of seeds are dispersed in this manner, those of the endangered wax palm seem to rely almost exclusively on mountain tapirs for dispersal, and this plant, along with the highland lupine, declines dramatically whenever the animal is extirpated from an area.

Predators of mountain tapirs include cougars, spectacled bears, and, less commonly, jaguars.

Behavior
When around other members of their species, mountain tapirs communicate through high-pitched whistles, and the males occasionally fight over estrous females by trying to bite each other's rear legs. But for the most part, mountain tapirs are shy and lead solitary lives, spending their waking hours foraging for food on their own along well-worn tapir paths. Despite their bulk, they travel easily through dense foliage, up the steep slopes of their hilly habitats, and in water, where they often wallow and swim.

Mountain tapirs are generally crepuscular, although they are more active during the day than other species of tapirs. They sleep from roughly midnight to dawn, with an additional resting period during the hottest time of the day for a few hours after noon, and prefer to bed down in areas with heavy vegetation cover. Mountain tapirs forage for tender plants to eat. When trying to access high plants, they will sometimes rear up on their hind legs to reach and then grab with their prehensile snouts. Though their eyesight is lacking, they get by on their keen senses of smell and taste, as well as the sensitive bristles on their proboscises.

Males will frequently mark their territory with dung piles, urine, and rubbings on trees, and females will sometimes engage in these behaviors, as well.

Distribution and habitat
The mountain tapir is found in the cloud forests and páramo of the Eastern and Central Cordilleras mountains in Colombia, Ecuador, and the far north of Peru. Its range may once have extended as far as western Venezuela, but it has long been extirpated from that region. During the wet season, mountain tapirs tend to inhabit the forests of the Andes, while during the drier months, they move to the páramo, where fewer biting insects pester them.

The mountain tapir has no recognised subspecies.

In Peru, it is protected in the National Sanctuary Tabaconas Namballe. The species needs continuous stretches of cloud forest and páramo, rather than isolated patches, to successfully breed and maintain a healthy population, and this obstacle is a major concern for conservationists trying to protect the endangered animal.

Evolution
The mountain tapir is the least specialised of the living species of tapir, and has changed the least since the origin of the genus in the early Miocene. Genetic studies have shown that mountain tapirs diverged from its closest relative, the Brazilian tapir, in the late Pliocene, around three million years ago. This would have been shortly after the formation of the Panamanian Isthmus, allowing the ancestors of the two living species to migrate southward from their respective points of origin in Central America as part of the Great American Interchange. However, the modern species most likely originated in the Andes, some time after this early migration.

Vulnerability

The mountain tapir is the most threatened of the five Tapirus species, classified as "Endangered" by the IUCN in 1996. According to the IUCN, there was a 20% chance the species could have been extinct as early as 2014. Due to the fragmentation of its surviving range, populations may already have fallen below the level required to sustain genetic diversity.

Historically, mountain tapirs have been hunted for their meat and hides, while the toes, proboscises, and intestines are used in local folk medicines and as aphrodisiacs. Since they will eat crops when available, they are also sometimes killed by farmers protecting their produce. Today, deforestation for agriculture and mining, and poaching are the main threats to the species.

There may be only 2,500 individuals left in the wild today, making it all the more difficult for scientists to study them. Also, very few individuals are found in zoos. Only a handful of breeding pairs of this species exists in captivity in the world — at the Los Angeles Zoo, the Cheyenne Mountain Zoo in Colorado Springs, and, as of 2006, the San Francisco Zoo. In Canada, a mating pair is kept in Langley, BC, at the Mountain View Conservation and Breeding Centre. The nine individuals in captivity are descendants of just two founder animals. This represents a distinct lack of genetic diversity and may not bode well for their continued existence in captivity. The three zoos that house this species are working to ensure that the remaining wild populations of mountain tapirs are protected. Two mountain tapirs were sent from San Francisco Zoo to Cali Zoo, making them be the only captive tapirs in their natural home range; one male is kept in Pitalito, it could be moved to the Cali Zoo to make a breeding pair.

Notes

Video/Multimedia
Video - Mountain Tapirs at the San Francisco Zoo

External links

Tapir Specialist Group – Mountain tapir
ARKive – images and movies of the mountain tapir (Tapirus pinchaque)

Tapirs
Mammals of the Andes
Mammals of Colombia
Mammals of Ecuador
Mammals of Peru
EDGE species
Mammals described in 1829
Páramo fauna